Roy Ferenčina (born 4 June 1970) is a Croatian football manager and former player. He also holds American citizenship and currently assistant head coach of  Croatian First Football League club Dinamo Zagreb.

Playing career

Club
Ferenčina spent his entire career playing for Croatian clubs and he had spells at Dinamo Zagreb, Trešnjevka, Inker Zaprešić, Marsonia and Hrvatski Dragovoljac before coming to Slaven Belupo in 1997. Ferenčina is mainly remembered for his time at Slaven, where he spent the last 8 years of his playing career, appearing in a total of 172 matches and scoring 11 goals for the club. Ferenčina retired from football in February 2005 after a fallout with Slaven manager Branko Karačić during the club's winter break friendly game at the Andrija Anković Memorial Tournament.

Managerial career
In the 2006–07 season Ferenčina worked at Slaven Belupo as assistant manager to Elvis Scoria. In January 2008 he was appointed manager of NK Lokomotiva youth team. He then served as assistant manager at Lokomotiva for three months in early 2009, before being appointed as the club's manager in April 2009, replacing Željko Pakasin. Led by Ferenčina, the club gained promotion to Prva HNL first time in their history at the end of the 2008–09 season, and then went on to finish 8th in the 2009–10 Prva HNL.

Personal life
His brother Damir was also a footballer.

References

External links
 Roy Ferenčina Prva HNL stats 
 Roy Ferenčina at Footballdatabase

1970 births
Living people
People from Harbor City, Los Angeles
Association football midfielders
Croatian footballers
NK Trešnjevka players
NK Inter Zaprešić players
NK Marsonia players
NK Hrvatski Dragovoljac players
NK Slaven Belupo players
Croatian Football League players
Croatian football managers
NK Lokomotiva Zagreb managers
NK Slaven Belupo managers
NK Vinogradar managers
FK Shkëndija managers
NK Hrvatski Dragovoljac managers
Croatian Football League managers
Croatian expatriate football managers
Expatriate football managers in North Macedonia
Croatian expatriate sportspeople in North Macedonia
Croatian expatriate sportspeople in Egypt
GNK Dinamo Zagreb non-playing staff